Attention Dimension is the first solo studio album by drummer Jack Irons. It was released on September 7, 2004, through Breaching Whale.

Overview 
Irons started creating his first pieces of drum music in 1994, but it was not until fall 1999, about a year after he left Pearl Jam, that he seriously began recording himself for a possible solo album, taking time out to record a new Eleven album, which the band released in 2003. Attention Dimension includes collaborations from friends and former bandmates like Alain Johannes, Natasha Shneider, Flea, Eddie Vedder, Stone Gossard, Jeff Ament, and Les Claypool. Vedder contributed vocals to a cover of Pink Floyd's "Shine On You Crazy Diamond". The album was produced by Irons. The album was mixed by Johannes and Adam Kasper. Johnny Loftus of Allmusic said, "There's no frontman hooting here, no lead guitar prima donna drama. Instead, Attention Dimension is the drummer's chance to be in the bright white klieg light. Give him a chance, will ya?"

Track listing

Personnel 
 Jack Irons – drums, percussion, synthesizer, keyboard bass, organ, organ bass, horns, sounds, guitar, vocals, production, engineering, artwork

Additional musicians and production
 Jeff Ament – fretless bass
 Charles Bates – layout design, logo design
 Les Claypool – electric bass
 Flea – electric bass
 Stone Gossard – guitar
 Bernie Grundman – mastering
 Sam Hofstedt, Floyd Reitsman – engineering
 Alain Johannes – vocals, marxophone, banjo, sounds, guitar, slide guitar, electric mridangam, horns, sigfiddle, tambourine, electric santoor, sarod, flute, soprano saxophone, engineering, mixing
 Adam Kasper – mixing
 Natasha Shneider – electric bass, piano, vocals, keyboards
 Eddie Vedder – vocals

References 

2004 debut albums
Jack Irons albums
Albums produced by Jack Irons